Qarnaveh may refer to:
 Qarnaveh-ye Olya
 Qarnaveh-ye Sofla